The 2004 New Zealand Warriors season was the 10th in the club's history. The club competed in Australasia's National Rugby League. The coach of the team was Daniel Anderson while Monty Betham was the club captain. Daniel Anderson resigned in June and was replaced by assistant coach Tony Kemp.

Milestones
8 May - Round 9: Stacey Jones makes his 200th first-grade appearance in New Zealand's 16–8 loss against the North Queensland Cowboys at Dairy Farmers Stadium.
30 May - Round 12: Brent Webb played in his 50th match for the club.
6 June - Round 13: Iafeta Paleaaesina played in his 50th match for the club.
18 July - Round 19: Vinnie Anderson played in his 50th match for the club.
14 August - Round 23: Lance Hohaia played in his 50th match for the club.
29 August - Round 25: Sione Faumuina played in his 50th match for the club.

Jersey & Sponsors

Fixtures

The Warriors used Ericsson Stadium as their home ground in 2004, their only home ground since they entered the competition in 1995.

Pre-season Trials
The Warriors played the St. George Illawarra Dragons in Hamilton.

Regular season

Ladder

Squad

Thirty five players were used by the Warriors in 2004, including seven players who made their first grade debuts. In addition PJ Marsh was in the squad but did not play a game due to a serious injury.

Staff
Chief executive officer: Mick Watson

Coaching Staff
Head coach: Daniel Anderson (until June, replaced by Tony Kemp)
Assistant coach: Tony Kemp
Assistant coach: Rohan Smith (left in June, joining the London Broncos)

Transfers

Gains

Losses

Mid-Season Losses

Other Teams

Players not required by the Warriors were released to play in the 2004 Bartercard Cup. These included Iafeta Paleaaesina, who played for the Hibiscus Coast Raiders, Brent Webb, who played for the North Harbour Tigers, Evarn Tuimavave, who played with the Marist-Richmond Brothers, Lance Hohaia, who played with the Waicoa Bay Stallions and the Eastern Tornadoes' Justin Murphy.

Awards
Wairangi Koopu won the Player of the Year award.

References

External links
Warriors official site
2004 Warriors Season at rugbyleagueproject.org

New Zealand Warriors seasons
New Zealand Warriors season
War